Events from the year 1718 in Great Britain.

Incumbents
 Monarch – George I
 Parliament – 5th

Events
 7 January – Religious Worship Act 1718 repeals the Occasional Conformity Act 1711 and Schism Act 1714, restoring some freedoms to dissenters.
 15 May – James Puckle patents the Puckle Gun.
 2 August – Quadruple Alliance formed between Britain, the Kingdom of France, the Holy Roman Empire and the Dutch Republic.
 11 August – a British fleet under Admiral Byng defeats a Spanish fleet at the Battle of Cape Passaro, a prelude to the War of the Quadruple Alliance.
 24 November – 'Calico Jack' Rackham becomes captain of the pirate sloop Ranger in The Bahamas.
 17 December – War of the Quadruple Alliance: Britain, the Kingdom of France, the Holy Roman Empire and the Dutch Republic declare war on Spain.

Undated
 The Proper motion of stars discovered by Edmond Halley.
 Marrow Controversy, an ecclesiastical dispute in Scotland, begins.
 Greenwich Hospital receives a Royal Charter (revoked in 1829).
 The Transportation Act 1717 comes into effect, providing the punishment of penal transportation (to British North America) as an alternative to a death sentence for lesser crimes.

Births
 18 February – Robert Henry, historian (died 1790)
 4 April – Benjamin Kennicott, churchman and Hebrew scholar (died 1783)
 7 April – Hugh Blair, preacher and man of letters (died 1800)
 17 May – Robert Darcy, 4th Earl of Holderness, diplomat and politician (died 1778)
 23 May – William Hunter, anatomist (died 1783)
 30 May – Wills Hill, 1st Marquess of Downshire, politician (died 1793)
 5 June – Thomas Chippendale, furniture maker (died 1779)
 17 June – George Howard, field marshal (died 1796)
 5 July – Francis Seymour-Conway, 1st Marquess of Hertford, Viceroy of Ireland (died 1794)
 31 July – John Canton, physicist (died 1772)
 3 November – John Montagu, 4th Earl of Sandwich, statesman (died 1792)

Deaths
 6 January – Richard Hoare, goldsmith and banker (born 1648)
 1 February – Charles Talbot, 1st Duke of Shrewsbury, politician (born 1660)
 17 February – Charlotte Lee, Countess of Lichfield, heiress (born 1664)
 18 February – Peter Anthony Motteux, dramatist and editor, probably murdered (born 1663 in France)
 30 July – William Penn, Quaker and founder of the Pennsylvania colony (born 1644)
 22 November – Blackbeard, pirate, killed in action (born c. 1680)
 6 December – Nicholas Rowe, poet laureate and dramatist (born 1674)

References

 
Years in Great Britain